Arvo Albert Viitanen (12 April 1924 – 28 April 1999) was a Finnish cross-country skier who competed in the 1950s. He won a silver medal in the 4 × 10 km relay at the 1956 Winter Olympics in Cortina d'Ampezzo. He was born in Uurainen, Central Finland and died in Myllykoski.

Viitanen also won five medals in the FIS Nordic World Ski Championships with a gold in the 4 × 10 km relay (1954), a silver in the 15 km (1954), and bronzes in the 50 km (1954, 1958) and the 4 × 10 km relay (1958).

He also won the 50 km event at the Holmenkollen ski festival in 1956.

Cross-country skiing results
All results are sourced from the International Ski Federation (FIS).

Olympic Games
 1 medal – (1 silver)

World Championships
 5 medals – (1 gold, 1 silver, 3 bronze)

References

External links
 
  
 

1924 births
1999 deaths
People from Uurainen
Olympic cross-country skiers of Finland
Cross-country skiers at the 1956 Winter Olympics
Finnish male cross-country skiers
Holmenkollen Ski Festival winners
Olympic silver medalists for Finland
Olympic medalists in cross-country skiing
FIS Nordic World Ski Championships medalists in cross-country skiing
Medalists at the 1956 Winter Olympics
Sportspeople from Central Finland
20th-century Finnish people